Dukhan is a city in the western municipality of Al-Shahaniya in the State of Qatar. Dukhan is administrated by Qatar's state oil agency QatarEnergy and is the site of the first oil discovery in Qatar. It was previously a part of Al Rayyan municipality.

All the industrial operations inside the city are administrated by the Dukhan Operations Department. A special permit from QatarEnergy, in the form of a Dukhan entry gate pass, is required for entry to the city. Dukhan Highway, a four-lane motorway that runs for approximately 66 km, connects the city with Doha.

Etymology

In Mike Morton's biography, In the Heart of the Desert, it is noted that the English translation of Dukhan is 'smoky mountain' (Jebel Dukhan), a reference to the clouds that gathered around its summit, and colloquially to the smoke emanating from gas flares around the oil camp named after it.

History of oil operations

Early operations

Oil exploration in the Dukhan area began in 1935. In 1937, oil was struck in Dukhan; making it the first substantial oil reserve to be discovered in the peninsula. Construction on Dukhan's first oil well began in 1939 and was finished the next year. The original settlement was built as an oil camp for personnel of the Qatar Petroleum Company (today QatarEnergy). Oil operations were temporarily shut down during World War II.

Supplies such as freshwater and food, as well as machinery, were imported from Bahrain through the shallow-water Zekreet Harbor, positioned slightly northward on the Bay of Zekreet. On 31 December 1949, Dukhan exported its first barrel of oil. On 28 March 1953, a massive fire erupted at well DK35, which was drilling the Arab-D reservoir. The full development of Dukhan's oil fields was completed in 1954. The city’s development entered a new stage of development when the Dukhan power station was commissioned in 1958, and when natural gas was found in the Khuff Reservoir the following year at an average depth of 10,000 feet.

Nationalization of oil industry (1973–present)
Over the next few decades Dukhan’s growth continued a steady pace. In 1974 the Fahahil plant was commissioned to recover raw natural gas liquids (NGL) from associated gas (which is found in either dissolved in crude oil or as a ‘cap’ of gas above the oil). This milestone was followed in 1976 by the first development well in the Khuff reservoir, and from 1978 to 1982 eight Khuff wellhead treatment plants were commissioned.

Dukhan expanded further in 1989, when the Dukhan reservoir Power Water Injection (PWI) project began, to address the problem of rising water levels in the reservoirs. PWI helped to enhance oil recovery and maintain reservoir pressure in the Dukhan field. Meanwhile, the Fahahil compression station began operations in 1992, to pressurise the Khuff reservoir with surplus North Field gas and help stabilise production. Progress continued throughout the late 1990s and early years of this decade, with several major enhancements – including the two-stage Arab D project to develop the production of gas and condensates, inaugurated by the Emir of Qatar in 1998.

The Dukhan Gas Lift project was planned in 1999 to help maintain crude oil production. The implementation is still in progress and is set to supply gas to approximately 300 wells in the area. Also forthcoming is Phase VI of the Powered Water Injection (PWI) project, which will increase the number of PWI stations from two to three and result in greater PWI capacity – rising from 538,000 to 708,000 barrels of water per day.

Oil-producing sectors

Dukhan has three main oil-producing sectors:
The Khatiyah sector, which was developed in 1947.
The Fahahil sector, which was developed between 1954 and 1955.
The Jaleha sector, which was developed between 1954 and 1955.

Industrial infrastructure
In 1990, there were 390 hydrocarbon wells in Dukhan, covering 0.08% of the area. Of the 390 wells, 140 were oil producing, 20 were gas producing and 219 were for other uses. The pipeline system for these wells covered 0.1% of the area and had an overall length . By 1990, there were seven degassing stations and two pumping stations. The Khatiyah sector was the most densely occupied in terms of infrastructure.

Residential developments
Dukhan's residential area was developed at the same time oil operations were commenced in 1940. The first residential area was a  fenced oil camp situated in close proximity to the oil fields. Several issues limited the growth of the camp in its early years, such as lack of private ownership and its remoteness from the capital city. The camp comprised eight residential zones, several administrative buildings, stores, workshops, and cultural facilities. Two schools, a hospital, and two mosques and a church were also located in the camp. Mike Morton remarked that in 1958, the oil camp had a club with tennis, billiards, hockey, football and cricket facilities, as well as a restaurant, a bar and a library. He claims that the club's bar was the focal point of the camp.

In the 1940s, communities started forming outside the camp in order to accommodate the increasing number of workers. The most notable community was that in the Khatiyah sector east of the camp. As an initiative to provide housing for Bedouins in the region, in the 1950s the government delegated Dukhan with the task of creating other settlements in the area. Two schools, several service buildings and additional settlements were built outside the camp in that decade. Some of these settlements include Al Zeghain, Afjan, Zekreet and Al Da'asa. The residential area doubled in size during that period.

21st century
The modern-day city of Dukhan evolved from the main oil camp and ensuing offshoot settlements that were established during the 20th century. In 2003, QR3 bn worth of projects were launched to develop the city. In 2012, a five-year development project on the city was announced by the chairman of QatarEnergy with a start date of 2013. The five-year development project was supposed to include a new school however due to budget cuts, following the falling oil prices, this plan was scrapped.

Visitor attractions

Dukhan Souq, a  marketplace, is located near the Khatiya area. It houses numerous shops and restaurants, a bank, a pharmacy and a Q-Post office.

Historic landmarks
Al Khotba Mosque, erected in 1942, is one of the oldest mosques in Dukhan. Its creation was planned shortly after the oil camp was established. It is noted for its unique decorative elements. The minaret, situated in the north-east section, lies on a square base and is barrel-shaped. An outdoor prayer area is accessible through six pathways in the courtyard, while the prayer hall has three entrances leading from the outdoor area.

Recreational facilities

Dukhan is served by several recreational facilities. One of the oldest recreation clubs in the city is Dukhan Recreation Club (DRC), formerly known as Dukhan Fields Club until 1988. It has a swimming centre, a garden, a conference centre, a library, a sports lounge, and an indoor stadium. It plays host to several community functions, such as the yearly Dukhan Women's Association handicraft exhibition, school events and sports events.

Jinan Recreation Club serves the city as a multi-recreational facility. It contains a library, a party hall, numerous sports facilities, and a cinema.

A fitness club exists in the city, but it is exclusive to QatarEnergy employees. Facilities are gender-segregated.

There is a water sports club in the community called Dukhan Water Sports (previously known as Dukhan Sailing Club). It was formed in the 1960s, and currently offers services such as powerboat sports, jet skiing and windsurfing. Events hosted by the club include an annual sailing regatta and an annual raft race. Dukhan also has a golf club; its facilities include a practice range, a lounge and a club house.

Dukhan Cinema opened in 1982. It has a 620-seating capacity and features four weekly multilingual shows. It also facilitates community functions and drama classes for Dukhan English School.

Transport

Road

The first road in Dukhan was built in 1940 to connect the oil camp to Doha. Travel by car to the capital took approximately 3 hours. A second road was built in 1948 to connect Dukhan to Umm Bab and Mesaieed. In the 1970s, the Salwa Road was developed to link all four of the aforementioned areas.

In 2014, Dukhan Highway, the road linking Dukhan to Doha, was reconstructed by the Public Works Authority as part of a $384.5 m project.

Air
Dukhan Airport, constructed in the late 1930s, was Qatar's first-ever airport but was eventually made obsolete by the Doha International Airport, opened in 1959. The airport grounds were left in ruins with some buildings (like the control tower) preserved. This airport is not related to the new Dukhan / Tamim Airbase, which was built in 2018.

Healthcare
Healthcare services in the city are provided by Dukhan Medical Centre. It offers primary healthcare, occupational healthcare, and dental services. Additionally, a contractor clinic is located in the city. The Directorate Industrial Security, a subsidiary of QatarEnergy, is the primary occupational safety agency in the Dukhan.

The Cuban Hospital opened in Dukhan in January 2012 and provides health services mainly to the city of Dukhan, the town of Umm Bab and the village of Zekreet. The hospital has a capacity of 75 beds and over 450 Cuban staff members.

Media
The community has two local publications: Dukhan Bulletin and Brooq Magazine.

Archaeology
Dukhan is one of the most important Paleolithic sites in the peninsula. One of the largest bifaces in Qatar, measuring 35 cm in length and 12 cm in width, was previously recovered from Dukhan. In 1960, the largest Paleolithic flint chipping site at that time was discovered 5 km south of Dukhan, around 500 ft from the shore. It covered 2.5 acres and contained an assortment of Stone Age implements such as arrowheads, blades, scrapers and hand axes. In Ras Uwainat Ali, 10 km north of Dukhan, camping grounds and flint tools were discovered. The archaeological sites of Ras Abrouq, Zekreet and Al Da'asa are also in the vicinity of Dukhan.

Geography

The southeasternmost section of the area lies at 60 m above sea level. Parts of Dukhan's sabkha zone in the north lie below sea level. A sequence of hillocks of Eocene limestone run in parallel throughout the coastal region. The top of the Rus Formation from the Lower Eocene period outcrops more than 25 meters in this area. The eastern portion comprises a lowland covered with rock fragments, consisting of wadis and vegetation-rich depressions (known as rawdas). Wadi Diab is one of the major dry riverbeds which extend through Dukhan.

A sabkha (salt flat) ecosystem known as the Dukhan Sabkha is found in the northern section. This sabkha, considered the largest inland salt flat in the Persian Gulf, runs for approximately 20 km, occupies an area of 73 km², has a width of 2 to 4 km and a depth of between 6 and 7 meters. It also accommodates the lowest point of Qatar, at six meters below sea level. As a result of high uranium content, the sabkha has very high levels of radioactivity, ranging from a mean of 16 to 75 cps. Studies suggest that the sabkha is fed by seawater from the Bay of Zekreet, north by approximately 3 km. A depression known as Rawdat Jarrah is the midpoint between the Bay of Zekreet and the sabkha; geologists have theorized that it may have been an extension of the bay as early 3,000 years ago.

Furthermore, the waters had a salinity of 64.40 psu, an average temperature 23.5°C and 6.77 mg/L of dissolved oxygen.

Jebel Dukhan
Jebel Dukhan is a range of uniquely shaped hills varying from 100 to 300 ft. above the level of the surrounding country, the surface being light sandy soil with a lot of loose stone.

Dukhan anticline
The Dukhan Oil Field is situated on the Dukhan anticline, a group of folds which runs in a NNW to SSE direction parallel with the western coast. The Dukhan anticline, with its thin lengthened structure and moderately steep dips stands out from the greater part of the neighboring folds. This has prompted some geologists to associate its formation with deep-seated salt movement. The overall length of the anticline is roughly 80 km above the lowest closing contour. Jebel Nakhsh lies at the southern boundary of the anticline. The Dukhan anticline demonstrates a range in the extremity of folding of along its length, the folding of the northern part being more pronounced than the southern.

Wildlife

Pastoralism has historically been dominant among the nomads of the area as many areas of Dukhan offer suitable grazing territory for camels. Common flora in the area used for grazing include zygophyllum qatarense and vachellia tortilis. 

Once oil activities commenced, grazing camels often suffered ill-effects from oil pollution and litter. Some camels unknowingly consume residue and waste material left over from oil extraction and fall sick. Furthermore, camels may come into contact with sensitive infrastructure, such as switches for oil wells and fences. Incidents have been recorded of camels causing leakages in oil wells, turning off oil wells and injuring themselves on such installations. It was reported in 1992 that oftentimes, camels crossing the roads around Dukhan were the cause of fatal motor accidents, particularly at night. In the early days of Dukhan's oil operations, livestock owners would be compensated by QatarEnergy for any incidents resulting in the death of their camels, however, this precedent was overruled in 1985, with the new official position stating that pastoralists were to be held responsible for their livestock.

The buffer zone of the Al Reem Biosphere Reserve starts at a point slightly north of the city.

Climate 
The following is climate data for Dukhan obtained from the Qatar Statistics Authority.

Administration
When free elections of the Central Municipal Council first took place in Qatar during 1999, Dukhan was designated the seat of constituency no. 25. It would remain constituency seat in the next three consecutive elections until being transferred to constituency no. 24 and being replaced as constituency seat by Al Jemailiya in the fifth municipal elections in 2015. In the inaugural municipal elections in 1999, Hassan Mesfer Al-Hajri won the elections, receiving 48.8%, or 122 votes. Runner-up candidate was Jaber Hamad Rashed, who attained 32.8%, or 82 votes. Overall, voter turnout was 72.3%. The 2002 elections saw Mohammed Rashid Al Shahwani emerge as the new constituent representative. In the third municipal elections in 2007, Rashid Abdul Hadi Al-Hajri was elected as the representative. During the 2011 elections, Mohamed Faisal Al Shahwani polled the highest and won the elections.

Education
The following schools are located in Dukhan:

Dukhan Learning Center is also located, just outside the city. It was inaugurated in 2012 to provide various training programs for QatarEnergy employees. It also accommodates a library.

References

Bibliography

 

Cities in Qatar
Populated places in Al-Shahaniya
Populated coastal places in Qatar